Sal and Gabi Fix the Universe is a novel written by Carlos Hernandez. The novel was published by Disney-Hyperion in May 2020 and follows Sal Vidón, a magician who can reach into parallel universes and Culeco Academy class president Gabi Reál as they find out from an alternate version of themselves that Sal's Papi's class-nine AI remembranation machine might destroy the universe as they know it.

The cover art was done by Andrea Galecio. A short story by Hernandez about the Sal and Gabi characters will be featured in the upcoming anthology book, The Cursed Carnival and Other Calamities.

Plot 
One day, Sal wakes up and finds that his annoying interdimensional power has been removed. While waiting for Gabi to arrive to walk him to school, he is visited by an alternate version of Gabi from another universe who he dubs "FixGabi" who tells him that his father's tinkering with the holes between the multiverse will destroy Sal's world.

Reception 
Publishers Weekly gave the book high reviews, claiming that "[the] story also speaks to the importance of both biological and found family, and the impact of love and acceptance." The book was also named to the Eleanor Cameron Notable Middle Grades Books List.

References 

American science fiction novels
2020 American novels
Disney Publishing Worldwide
2020 science fiction novels
Hyperion Books books
Sequel novels